Leptomyrmex fragilis is a species of ant in the genus Leptomyrmex. Described by Smith in 1859, the species is endemic to Indonesia and New Guinea and the Philippines.

References

Dolichoderinae
Hymenoptera of Asia
Insects of Indonesia
Insects of New Guinea
Insects of the Philippines
Insects described in 1859